Chris Lonsdale or Christopher Lonsdale may refer to:

 Chris Lonsdale (cricketer) (born 1987), former Bermudian cricketer and footballer
 Chris Lonsdale (entrepreneur), entrepreneur, language educator and author of The Third Ear
 Christopher Lonsdale (1886-1952), founder and first headmaster of Shawnigan Lake School in Shawnigan Lake, British Columbia